Ekaterina Paniouchkina (Russian: Екатерина Паниушкина; born 29 January 1981) is a former professional tennis player from Russia.

Paniouchkina has career-high WTA rankings of 635 in singles, achieved on 20 December 1999, and 291 in doubles, set on 11 October 1999. She has 3 doubles titles on the ITF Women's Circuit.

In 1999 Her only WTA Tour main draw appearance came at the 1999 she partnered with Anastasia Rodionova in the doubles event. But first round lost German Julia Abe and Israeli Nataly Cahana.

ITF Circuit finals

Doubles: 4 (3–1)

References

External links 
 
 

1981 births
Living people
Tennis players from Moscow
Russian female tennis players
21st-century Russian women
20th-century Russian women